Robert Lindsey may refer to:
Robert Lisle Lindsey (1917–1995), Israeli New Testament scholar
Robert Lindsey (journalist) (born 1935), author of the book The Falcon and the Snowman

See also
Robert Lindsay (disambiguation)
Robert Linzee (1739–1804), officer of the Royal Navy